William Lincoln Mathues (March 24, 1862 – December 30, 1908) was an American politician who served as Pennsylvania Treasurer from 1905 to 1906. Born and raised on a farm in Delaware County, Mathues attended public schools in Media, became a lawyer, and served as deputy sheriff and prothonotary between 1885 and 1904. He was convicted on corruption charges in connection to the Pennsylvania State Capitol graft scandal and died of pneumonia in 1908 before going to prison.

References 

1862 births
1908 deaths
Deaths from pneumonia in Pennsylvania
People from Middletown Township, Delaware County, Pennsylvania
Pennsylvania Republicans
State treasurers of Pennsylvania
American politicians convicted of fraud
Pennsylvania politicians convicted of crimes